Masuna or Massonas was a Berber from what is now western Algeria who was said to have been a Christian, he ruled the Mauro-Roman Kingdom with its capital based in Altava which is now in present-day Algeria around the Tlemcen area. He was able to maintain the independence of his kingdom by resisting occupation from the Vandals. King Masuna allied with the Eastern Roman Emperor Justinian and assisted him in a war against the Vandals in 533 and also against other invading Berber tribal confederations. During his reign he was obeyed by the tribes of Mauretania.

Reign 
Masuna was the earliest recorded ruler of the Mauro-Roman Kingdom, a Berber kingdom that sprung up in the former province of Mauretania Caesariensis following the collapse of the Western Roman Empire. This kingdom, unlike many other Barbarian kingdoms, extended beyond the borders of the former Roman Empire, encompassing Berber territories that had never been under Roman control. Masuna is known only from an inscription on a fortification in Altava (modern Ouled Mimoun, in the region of Oran), dated 508 AD, where he styles himself as the Rex gentium Maurorum et Romanorum, the "King of the Roman and Moorish peoples". He is known to have possessed Altava, assumed to have been the capital due to its prominence under subsequent kings, and at least two other cities, Castra Severiana and Safar, as mention is made of officials he appointed there. As the seat of an ecclesiarchal diocese (the diocese of Castra Severiana, an ancient bishophoric which flourished during Late Antiquity), the control of Castra Severiana may have been particularly important.

Relations with the Eastern Roman Empire 
The Eastern Roman historian Procopius mentions a Berber king called "Massonas", often assumed to be the same person as Masuna, as having allied with the forces of the Eastern Roman Empire in the 530s against the Vandal Kingdom in the Vandalic War. Masuna is assumed to have been among the Berber rulers that willingly submitted to Belisarius and the Eastern Roman forces, demanding in return the symbols of their offices; a silver crown, a staff of silver gilt, a tunic and gilded boots.

After the Vandals were defeated and the Eastern Roman Empire restored Roman rule over Northern Africa, the local Byzantine governors would begin to experience problems with some of the local Berber tribes and kingdoms. The province of Byzacena was particularly affected, seeing repeated invasions and the destruction of the local garrison and death of its commanders. The Praetorian prefect of Africa, Solomon, waged several wars against these Berbers and defeated them twice. Surviving Berber soldiers retreated into Numidia, joining forces with Iaudas, King of the Aurès.

Masuna and another Berber king allied with the Eastern Empire, Ortaias (who ruled a kingdom in the former province of Mauretania Sitifensis), suggested that Solomon pursue the enemy Berbers into Numidia, which he did. Solomon did not engage Iaudas in battle however as he distrusted the loyalty of his allies, and instead constructed a series of fortified posts along the roads linking Byzacena with Numidia.

References

Citations

Bibliography
 
 
 
 
 
 

Mauretania Caesariensis
Berber rulers
Berber Christians
Christianity in Algeria
6th-century Berber people
6th-century monarchs in Africa
Mauro-Roman Kingdom
Monarchs of the Mauro-Roman Kingdom